Somila Seyibokwe (born 31 October 1987) is a South African cricketer. He was included in the Border cricket team for the 2015 Africa T20 Cup.

References

External links
 

1987 births
Living people
South African cricketers
Border cricketers
Place of birth missing (living people)